WLVK (105.5 FM) is a radio station  broadcasting a classic hits format, simulcasting WAKY-FM 103.5 Radcliff. WLVK is licensed to serve the community of Fort Knox, Kentucky, United States.  The station is currently owned by W & B Broadcasting Co., Inc

History
The station was assigned the call letters WASE on October 1, 1967. The station from time considered Top 40 and Adult Contemporary formats from the 1960s until the early 1990s. On October 14, 1993, the station changed its call sign to WASE-FM then again on July 25, 1995, to the current WLVK.

On April 3, 2022, WLVK flipped from country to a simulcast of classic hits station WAKY-FM 103.5 Radcliff.

Previous logos

References

External links

LVK
Classic hits radio stations in the United States
Hardin County, Kentucky
1967 establishments in Kentucky
Radio stations established in 1967